Mahesh Acharya was the minister of Forest and Soil Conservation of Nepal under the government led by Sushil Koirala.  Acharya won the Morang–6 seat in Nepalese Constituent Assembly election, 2013 from the Nepali Congress. Acharya is the member of the 2nd Nepalese Constituent Assembly, he is a central member of Nepali congress, Acharya plunged into politics since panchayat era from NC, by taking part in the anti-panchayat movement with leaders including Bishweshwar Prasad Koirala , Girija Prasad Koirala.

Personal life
Mahesh Acharya was born to Ganesh Prasadh Acharya and Shanta Acharya on 6 August 1954 in Biratnagar, Nepal.

Political career

He participated in 1989 and 2006 democratic movements too. From various committees of Nepal Student Union to different units and organization of the NC, he took responsibility with key roles. He was Minister of Finance of Nepal from 1991 to 1994 and from 1999 to 2001. He lost the election in 2017 from Morang - 4.

References

1954 births
Living people
Government ministers of Nepal
Nepali Congress politicians from Koshi Province
Finance ministers of Nepal
People from Biratnagar
Nepal MPs 1999–2002
Koirala family
Khas people
Members of the 2nd Nepalese Constituent Assembly